Gordon Donald Collis (born 6 November 1940) is a former Australian rules footballer in the Victorian Football League.

Recruited from Healesville, Collis played less than 100 games of VFL football, but his place in history is assured as a winner of one of the game's highest honours – the Brownlow Medal. 

Collis won the medal in 1964 with 27 votes, although his Carlton Football Club had its worst finish in the VFL, ending the season in 10th position. 

Wearing number 17 for the Blues between 1961 and 1967 (playing 95 games and booting 40 goals), the red-haired Collis played primarily at centre half-back before injuries forced his retirement.

Collis credited his optician with the Brownlow win, as in 1963 he struggled to see the ball and "All the other chaps would be coming down as I started to go up." This was rectified with contact lenses, resulting in a much improved 1964. Collis became Carlton's second Medallist in four years, following John James who won in 1961.

References 

1940 births
Living people
Carlton Football Club players
Brownlow Medal winners
John Nicholls Medal winners
Australian rules footballers from Victoria (Australia)